The Chuquisaca Revolution was a popular uprising on 25 May 1809 against the governor and intendant of Chuquisaca (today Sucre, Bolivia), Ramón García León de Pizarro. The Real Audiencia of Charcas, with support from the faculty of University of Saint Francis Xavier, deposed the governor and formed a junta. The revolution is known in Bolivia as the "First cry of freedom", meaning, the first step in the Spanish American wars of independence; but historians dispute whether such a description is accurate or not.

Causes
Although nearly 30 years had passed, the indigenous revolutions led by Túpac Amarú II and Tomás Katari, and their violent repression, were still remembered. Those revolutions ranged from the south of modern Colombia to the north of modern Argentina and Chile.

There was great concern about recent developments at Spain. French forces led by Napoleon had invaded many parts of the country and captured the Spanish king Ferdinand VII, replacing him with the French Joseph Bonaparte, brother of Napoleon. Without the authority of a king leading them, the Spanish resistance created Government Juntas.

Development

The news of the fall of Ferdinand VII in Spain caused great concern in the city, and in the University of Chuquisaca there were important debates about the legitimacy of the government. Bernardo de Monteagudo explained an idea that promoted Self-determination, which would be later known as "Syllogism of Chuquisaca" It stated the following:

The junta, initially loyal to King Ferdinand VII of Spain, was justified by the suspicion that García León de Pizarro planned to turn the country over to Princess Carlota Joaquina, wife of prince regent John of Portugal and Brazil, but from the beginning the revolution provided a framework for the actions of the separatists who spread the rebellion to La Paz, where a Junta Tuitiva ("protecting junta") was formed on 16 July. The latter clearly broke with any authority in Spain and with the Viceroyalty of the Río de la Plata. After the second, more radical uprising was repressed violently by an army sent by Viceroy Baltasar Hidalgo de Cisneros, the movement at Chuquisaca lost all external support and was finally undone by forces sent from Lima by Viceroy José Fernando de Abascal in October.

Historiography
This revolution did not intend to alter Chuquisaca's loyalty to the king, while the revolution of La Paz openly declared independence. Today, historians do not agree on whether the revolution of Chuquisaca was motivated by independence or if it was just a dispute between supporters of Ferdinand VII and Carlota. Consequently, there is disagreement on whether the first revolution to proclaim independence in Spanish America was that of Chuquisaca or that of La Paz. The researchers Juan Reyes and Genoveva Loza support the latter, arguing that in Chuquisaca the Spanish system of government was maintained and that it did not support the revolution in La Paz, while others such as Charles Arnade, Teodocio Imaña, Gabriel René Moreno or Felipe Pigna argue that the Chuquisaca revolution supported independence, citing as its main foundation the political philosophical concept of the "Syllogism of Chuquisaca" that proposed self-determination. Even more, Other historians locate the first "libertarian scream" at Ecuador rather than Bolivia, because of a revolt that took place in Quito in August, 1809.

Revolution in Chuquisaca

Alto Peru 
The territory of Upper Peru, today a primary part of Bolivia, was made up of four provinces and two political-military governments. . One of the provinces was that of Chuquisaca, in whose capital Chuquisaca —also called La Plata or Charcas and today Sucre, 19°2′35″S 65°15′33″W— had its headquarters for the Royal Court of Charcas.

Bibliography

See also
 Bolivian War of Independence
 La Paz revolution
May Revolution

References

External links
 25 de mayo: 1809 Insurrección en Chuquisaca – 1810 Revolución en Buenos Aires

1809 in Bolivia
1810s in Bolivia
Bolivian War of Independence
Colonial Bolivia
Conflicts in 1809
19th-century rebellions
19th century in the Viceroyalty of the Río de la Plata
May 1809 events